The Spectrum S-33 Independence is a very light jet designed and built by Spectrum Aeronautical using a carbon fiber construction process that makes the airplane weigh about two thirds as much as a comparably sized aluminum-frame airplane.

The aircraft is designed to cruise at 45,000 ft. at speeds up to 415 knots (Mach 0.72) and fly as far as 2000 nm (3700 km) while using about half the fuel of comparably sized aluminum-framed business aircraft. FAA and JAA Type Certifications of the S-33 Independence were expected to be completed in 2009, but were not. The company has provided no press releases to explain the long delay in gaining certification.

The aircraft is reported to be able to accommodate 5–6 passenger seats, a full-sized private lavatory, and will have a maximum take-off weight of 7,300 lb., with a range of over 2,000 miles.

The retail sales price of the aircraft, which is equipped with Williams FJ-33 engines  is supposed to be US-$3.95 million. The aircraft is to be released about 12 months after the bigger S-40 "Freedom". In May 2011 Spectrum president Austin Blue said, "We are still trying to get the programmes advancing, but it is not easy".

Accident
The only completed S-33, registration N322LA, crashed in a test flight July 25, 2006 in Spanish Fork, Utah, killing the two test pilots aboard, Glenn Maben and Nathan Forrest. The aircraft rolled right immediately after takeoff, reaching a 90 degree angle before the wingtip struck the ground. The preliminary NTSB report revealed that the control linkage had been connected backwards during maintenance after the previous flight, resulting in opposite control output (a left roll input on the control stick resulting in the aircraft rolling right).

Specifications

See also
 Spectrum S-40 Freedom

References

External links
 Spectrum Aeronautical

S-33
2000s United States business aircraft
Very light jets
Twinjets
Aircraft first flown in 2006